"La kiffance" is a song by French rapper Naps released in 2021. It spends 10 non-consecutive weeks at number one on the French Singles Chart.

Charts

Weekly charts

Year-end charts

References

2021 songs
2021 singles
French-language songs
SNEP Top Singles number-one singles
French hip hop songs